The City of Parramatta, also known as Parramatta Council, is a local government area located west of central Sydney in the Greater Western Sydney region. The city occupies an area of  spanning across suburbs in Greater Western Sydney including the Hills District, and a small section of Northern Sydney to the far north east of its area. The city houses the Parramatta central business district which is one of the key suburban employment destinations for the region of Greater Western Sydney.

The Lord Mayor of the City of Parramatta since 10 January 2022 is The Right Worshipful Donna Davis, a member of the Australia Labor Party.

History 

First incorporated on 27 November 1861 as the "Municipality of Parramatta", the first Mayor was emancipated convict John Williams who arrived in the colony in 1835. The council became known as the "Borough of Parramatta" on 23 December 1867 following the enactment of the Municipalities Act, 1867, and became a Municipality again following the 1906 Local Government Act. On 27 October 1938, the Local Government (City of Parramatta) Act was passed by the Parliament of New South Wales and proclaimed by the Governor, Lord Wakehurst, making the town the "City of Parramatta".

From 1 January 1949 the "City of Parramatta" was re-formed following the passing of the Local Government (Areas) Act 1948, when the councils of Ermington and Rydalmere (incorporated 1891), Dundas (incorporated 1889) and Granville (incorporated 1885) were merged into the council area. The Parramatta local government area was further expanded through the transfer of 10.7 km2 from the Municipality of Blacktown in 1972. In recognition of Parramatta's role Bi-centennial (coinciding with the Australian Bi-centennial), the title of 'Lord Mayor' was granted on 12 December 1988 by Queen Elizabeth II on the recommendation of Premier Nick Greiner. This made Parramatta the third Australian city that was not a capital to receive such an honour, after Newcastle and Wollongong.

2016 amalgamation
A 2015 review of local government boundaries by the NSW Government Independent Pricing and Regulatory Tribunal recommended that the City of Parramatta be reformed, adding areas from several adjoining councils. The NSW Government subsequently proposed a merger of parts of Parramatta (Woodville Ward), Auburn and Holroyd and a second merger of parts of the rest of Parramatta and parts of Auburn, The Hills, Hornsby, and Holroyd to form a new council.

On 12 May 2016, Parramatta City Council was abolished by the NSW Government. Parts of Auburn City Council (south of the M4 Western Motorway) and Parramatta City Council (Woodville Ward), and Holroyd City Council merged to form the Cumberland Council as a new local government area and the remainder of the Parramatta City Council, Auburn City Council north of the M4 Western Motorway (including Sydney Olympic Park), and small parts of Hornsby Shire, Holroyd and The Hills Shire were merged into the reformed "City of Parramatta".

Suburbs in the local government area
Suburbs in the City of Parramatta are:

Facilities
The City of Parramatta Council operates a central library, heritage centre and six branch libraries at Carlingford, Constitution Hill, Dundas Valley, Epping, Ermington and Wentworth Point. It also provides a public swimming pool at Epping, five childcare centres and over ten community centres. The heritage-listed Parramatta Town Hall was completed in 1883 and houses the original Council chamber meeting rooms as well as other function rooms.

Demographics 
At the 2016 census, there were  people in the City of Parramatta local government area that comprised , of these 50% were male and 50% were female. Aboriginal and Torres Strait Islander people made up 0.7% of the population. The median age of people in the City of Parramatta was 34 years; notably below the national median of 38 years. Children aged 0 – 14 years made up 18.4% of the population and people aged 65 years and over made up 12.2% of the population. Of people in the area aged 15 years and over, 55.4% were married and 9% were either divorced or separated.
At the 2016 Census, the Parramatta local government area was linguistically diverse, with a significantly higher than average proportion (54.2%) where two or more languages are spoken (national average was 22.2%); and a significantly lower proportion (41.47) where English only was spoken at home (national average was 72.7%). The most commonly reported religious affiliation was "No Religion", at 24.5%.  The proportion of residents who stated a religious affiliation with Hinduism was approximately six times the national average, with the median weekly income for residents slightly above the national average.

Council

Between May 2016 and September 2017, the council was managed by an Administrator appointed by the Government of New South Wales, Amanda Chadwick, until the first election for councillors took place on 9 September 2017. The City of Parramatta Council comprises fifteen Councillors elected proportionally, with three Councillors in each ward. All Councillors are elected for a fixed four-year term of office. The Lord Mayor is elected for a two-year term, with the Deputy Lord Mayor for one year, by the Councillors at the first meeting of the council.

Current composition
The most recent election was held on 4 December 2021, and the makeup of the council, in order of election by ward, is as follows:

Sister cities
  Beersheba, Israel
  Cebu City, Philippines
  Jung District, Seoul, South Korea
  Phetchaburi, Thailand
  Putian, China
  Vũng Tàu, Vietnam

See also

 Local government areas of New South Wales

References

External links
 City of Parramatta Council website
 Discover Parramatta
 Riverside Theatre Parramatta

 
1861 establishments in Australia
Parramatta